Swansea Victoria is a former railway station in Swansea, south Wales, opened to passenger and goods traffic on 14 December 1867. Owned successively by the Llanelly Railway and Dock Company (1867 to 1871), the Swansea and Carmarthen Railways Company (1871 to 1873), the London and North Western Railway Company (L.N.W.R., 1873 to 1922), the London, Midland and Scottish Railway Company (L.M.S., 1923 to 1947) and British Railways (1948 to 1964), it was served by trains to and from Shrewsbury, Crewe, Liverpool, Manchester and York and formed the southern terminus of the Central Wales line, most of which is still operational as the Heart of Wales Line. Victoria closed in June 1964, having been listed in the Report on the Reshaping of British Railways (better known as the Beeching Report) the previous year. The site was subsequently cleared and used for Swansea Leisure Centre (now the LC).

References

External links
Swansea Victoria railway station at Coflein

Disused railway stations in Swansea
Railway stations in Great Britain closed in 1964
Railway stations in Great Britain opened in 1867
Former London and North Western Railway stations
Beeching closures in Wales